Dan Singh Bhandari is an Indian politician and member of the Bharatiya Janata Party. Malchand is a member of the Uttarakhand Legislative Assembly from the Bhimtal constituency in Nainital district.

References 

People from Nainital district
Indian National Congress politicians
Bharatiya Janata Party politicians from Uttarakhand
Members of the Uttarakhand Legislative Assembly
Living people
21st-century Indian politicians
Year of birth missing (living people)